MS 862 is the number in the nineteenth-century Donaueschingen catalogue of a South German fechtbuch dating to ca. 1500. It is influenced by Paulus Kal and Peter Falkner, and was in turn drawn upon by Jorg Wilhalm (1520s). The manuscript was up for auction at Sotheby's in 2005. 

It was acquired in 2008 by the Musée National du Moyen Age in Paris, where it was on display  with inventory number CL23842.

Contents
 fols. 12r-57v, fencing with the longsword, 92 pictures, 37 of them with captions, showing two young men in combat, one dressed in pale red, one in blue.
 fols. 60r-69v,  fighting with großes Messer, 20 pictures, no captions, the same two young men in chivalric combat.
 foll. 72r-87v,  fighting with daggers, 32 pictures, one caption, the two young men again.
 foll. 95r-114v,  grappling, 40 pictures, no captions, the same two young men demonstrating holds and throws and a hold to immobilise two assailants at once (fol.114v).
 foll. 118r-131v,  fighting with a sword and buckler, 28 pictures, no captions.
 foll. 133v-148r,n fighting on horseback, 29 pictures, including competing with lances (fols. 133v-136v), swords (fols.137r-140v), wrestling on horseback (fols. 141r-146r, including wrestling the opponent's horse too), and fighting when one contestant is on horseback and one on the ground (fols. 146v-148r).
 fols. 149r-178v,  58 pictures, armoured combat, two with captions, fols.149r, 150r with lances), mostly with longswords, a scene of wounding on fol. 166r.
 fols. 180r-181v, 4 pictures, no captions, franconian judicial duels with shields and clubs, shields alone, and shield against  swiss dagger.
 foll. 183r-191v, miscellaneous combats, 17 pictures, no captions, including  poleaxes, maces, shields, battle-axes and lances, some  armoured.
 fols. 194r-v, 2 pictures, two men in loincloths  with swords, and a woman with a ball on a chain fighting a man with a club standing in a pit (franconian judicial duels).
 fols. 195r-121v, on fighting in full armour, 36 pictures, one caption, fighting with swords but often held from the middle or the other end (a style of fighting known as Gladiatorial, derived from a manuscript now in the Jagellonian library in Cracow, formerly in Berlin; cf. H. Wegener, Miniaturen-Handschriften der Preussischer Staatsbibliothek zu Berlin, Die Deutschen Handschriften bis 1500, V, 1928, pp. 61–2).

References
 K. A. Barack, Die Handschriften der Fürstlich-Fürstenbergischen Hofbibliothek zu Donaueschingen, 1865, 583.
 M. Wierschin, Meister Johann Liechtenauers Kunst des Fechtens, 1965, no. 3.
 H.-P. Hils, Meister Johann Liechtenauers Kunst des langen Schwertes, Frankfurt, 1985, no. 14, 46–50.
 H.-P. Hils in Die Deutsche Literatur des Mittelalters, Verfasserlexikon, 2 ed., V, 1985, cols. 811–6.
 F. Heinzer, Die Neuen Standorte der Ehemals Donaueschinger Handschriftensammlung, Scriptorium, XLIX, 1995, 317.

External links
 Select images from the manuscript, courtesy of the Musée National du Moyen Age.

16th-century illuminated manuscripts
Combat treatises